Dores do Rio Preto is the westernmost municipality in the Brazilian state of Espírito Santo. Its population was 6,771 (2020) and its area is 153.106 km². The village Pedras Meninas in Dores is the location for the entrance to Caparaó National Park and the Pico da Bandeira from Espirito Santo.

References

Municipalities in Espírito Santo
Populated places established in 1964